Out of This Furnace is a historical novel and the best-known work of the American writer Thomas Bell.  It was first published in 1941 by Little, Brown and Company.

Description
The novel is set in Braddock, Pennsylvania, a steel town just east of Pittsburgh, along the Monongahela River. Based upon Bell's own family of Rusyn and Slovak immigrants, the story follows three generations of a family, starting with their migration in 1881 from Austria-Hungary to the United States, and finishing with World War II. The novel focuses on the steelworkers' attempt to unionize from 1889, the first Homestead strike (mentioned by Andrej on p. 38) through the big Homestead Steel Strike of 1892, the Great Steel Strike of 1919 right after World War I, and the events of the 1930s. A common connection of struggle, poverty, and entire need of the characters of forces out of their control come together to tell a story of a tragic depiction of a truly troubled group of people. Shared with unbearable financial adversity, the Rusyns and Slovaks nicknamed "Hunkies" were also exposed to discrimination by other "Americans."  The novel's title refers to the central role of the steel mill in the family's life and in the history of the Pittsburgh region.

Reissue
Long out of print, the novel was rediscovered in the 1970s by David P. Demarest, a professor of English at Carnegie Mellon University, who convinced director Frederick A. Hetzel at the University of Pittsburgh Press to reissue it in 1976. The book quickly became a regional bestseller. By the 1980s, however, it found an even larger readership on American college campuses. Out of This Furnace is regularly used as required reading in universities to introduce students to the history of immigration, industrialization, and the rise of trade unionism, as well as to the genre of the American working class novel.

Adaptations
The novel was adapted into a play by Andy Wolk, and Pittsburgh theatre company Iron Clad Agreement mounted a well-received production of it in 1977.  Unseam'd Shakespeare Company mounted successful productions of the play in 2008 (as part of Pittsburgh's 250th anniversary) and 2011.

Further reading

References

American historical novels
Rusyn-American history
Slovak-American history
1941 American novels
Novels set in Pittsburgh
Allegheny County, Pennsylvania
Rusyn-American culture in Pennsylvania
Slovak-American culture in Pennsylvania
Pittsburgh Labor History
American novels adapted into plays
Rusyn culture